The 1932 Oregon Webfoots football team was an American football team that represented the University of Oregon in the Pacific Coast Conference (PCC) during the 1932 college football season.  In their first season under head coach Prink Callison, the Webfoots compiled a 6–3–1 record (2–2–1 against PCC opponents), finished in a tie for fifth place in the PCC, and outscored their opponents, 109 to 64. The team played its home games at Hayward Field in Eugene, Oregon. Tackle Bill Morgan was the team captain.

Schedule

References

Oregon
Oregon Ducks football seasons
Oregon Webfoots football